Portugal competed at the 2020 Summer Paralympics in Tokyo, Japan, from 24 August to 5 September 2021.

Medalists

Athletics 

Ten Portuguese athletes have all qualified to compete.
Men's track

Men's field

Women's track

Women's field

Badminton 

Beatriz Monteiro has qualified to compete.

Boccia 

Ten boccia players have qualified to compete.

Cycling 

Portugal sent two male cyclists to compete.

Equestrian 

Portugal sent one athlete after being qualified.

Judo 

Djibrilo Iafa has qualified to compete in the under 73kg class.

Paracanoeing 

Norberto Mourão and Alex Santos have both qualified.

Swimming 

Diogo Cancela, David Grachat, Marco Meneses, Ivo Rocha, Daniel Videira and Susana Veiga have all qualified to compete.

See also 
Portugal at the Paralympics
Portugal at the 2020 Summer Olympics

References 

Nations at the 2020 Summer Paralympics
2020
2021 in Portuguese sport